The 2023 Zamfara State gubernatorial election will take place on 18 March 2023, to elect the Governor of Zamfara State, concurrent with elections to the Zamfara State House of Assembly as well as twenty-seven other gubernatorial elections and elections to all other state houses of assembly. The election—which was postponed from its original 11 March date—was held three weeks after the presidential election and National Assembly elections. Incumbent APC Governor Bello Matawalle has been renominated by his party.

The primaries, scheduled for between 4 April and 9 June 2022, resulted in Matawalle being renominated by the All Progressives Congress unopposed on 26 May while the Peoples Democratic Party nominated banker Dauda Lawal on 25 May. However, Lawal was removed as nominee by a Federal High Court on 16 September due to irregularities in the primary; the PDP conducted a new primary on 23 September that resulted in Lawal winning again. A Federal High Court ruling on 8 November invalidated the rerun primary and barred the party from fielding a nominee but the ruling was overturned by an Appeal Court judgment on 6 January.

Electoral system
The Governor of Zamfara State is elected using a modified two-round system. To be elected in the first round, a candidate must receive the plurality of the vote and over 25% of the vote in at least two-thirds of state local government areas. If no candidate passes this threshold, a second round will be held between the top candidate and the next candidate to have received a plurality of votes in the highest number of local government areas.

Background
Zamfara State is highly populated northwestern state mainly inhabited by ethnic Hausas and Fulanis. In the years before the election, the state was beset by the bandit conflict along with herder–farmer clashes and the nationwide kidnapping epidemic as bandits raid entire towns, kidnap school children, and attack motorists.

Politically, the 2019 elections were initially a continuation of the state APC's dominance as the party's presidential nominee Muhammadu Buhari won the state by over 50% and the party won all three senate seats while also sweeping the House of Representatives elections. On the state level, the APC also retained its House of Assembly majority and its nominee—Mukhtar Shehu Idris—won the gubernatorial election by a wide margin. However, right before inaugurations, the Supreme Court ruled that the Zamfara APC did not hold valid primaries and thus all of its candidates were disqualified. Matawalle, and every other PDP runner-up, was sworn in and the state was entirely PDP-run until June 2021 when Matawalle led nearly every elected official in the state into the APC.

Ahead of Matawalle's term, the aims were to end banditry while addressing poverty, unemployment, and illiteracy. In terms of his performance, Matawalle was commended for revoking former elected officials' life pensions. However, he was criticized for spending a hundred million naira in public funds on a private university, rising insecurity, hiring over 1700 aides, blaming banditry on "political bandits" without evidence, orchestrating the politically-motivated impeachment of Deputy Governor Mahdi Aliyu Mohammed Gusau, politically-motivated press censorship, and infringements on constitutionally-mandated secularism along with two prominent examples of luxury car purchases for officials—19 cars for commissioners in May 2020 and over 250 cars for traditional leaders in April 2022.

Primary elections
The primaries, along with any potential challenges to primary results, were to take place between 4 April and 3 June 2022 but the deadline was extended to 9 June.

All Progressives Congress 
The internal power-struggle between former Governor Abdul'aziz Abubakar Yari and former Senator Kabir Garba Marafa that led to the disqualification of all 2019 Zamfara APC candidates continued after the election until Matawalle's defection in 2021. As Matawalle suddenly became the preeminent Zamfara APC politician, Yari and Marafa briefly reconciled to face Matawalle together before splitting again ahead of the state party congress in late 2021. Infighting between the groups supported by Matawalle, Marafa, and Yari each culminated in three divided party factions, all claiming to be the legitimate party structure. As Matawalle is a serving governor, his faction was recognized by the national party in February 2022 but the internal struggles continued until a peace was brokered by national APC leadership in May.

Ahead of the primary, Abdulmalik Gajam—a youth leader and son of former ambassador Garba Gajam—declared a primary challenge to Matawalle; while analysts noted that Gajam's bid had little chance and was likely just an attempt to raise his own profile, Matawalle's allies continuously attempted to convince Gajam to step down. On the primary date, Gajam finally withdrew leading Matawalle to win the nomination unopposed. In his acceptance speech, Matawalle thanked former Governor Mahmud Shinkafi along with both Yari and Marafa while highlighting party unity.

Nominated 
 Bello Matawalle: Governor (2019–present)
 Running mate—Hassan Nasiha: Deputy Governor (2022–present) and former Senator for Zamfara Central (2007–2011; 2019–2022)

Withdrew 
 Abdulmalik Gajam: youth leader and son of former ambassador Garba Gajam

Results

People's Democratic Party 
In the wake of Matawalle’s defection to the APC, Deputy Governor Mahdi Aliyu Mohammed Gusau swiftly took control of the Zamfara PDP and was named state party leader, even representing Zamfara at PDP Governors Forum meetings. Mohammed Gusau received support from high-profile national PDP figures and fear of his potential gubernatorial run allegedly led to Mohammed Gusau's impeachment in February 2022; however, Mohammed Gusau ended up announcing his run for governor anyway.

Ahead of the May primary, reports emerged that Aliyu Mohammed Gusau—former Defence Minister, father of Mahdi, and de facto leader of the Zamfara PDP—along with other Zamfara PDP figures backed banker Dauda Lawal instead of Mahdi or other candidates. On the initial primary date, Mahdi Aliyu Mohammed Gusau abruptly withdrew and endorsed Lawal while the other four candidates continued to an indirect primary that resulted in Lawal's victory after results showed him winning about 98% of the delegates' votes. After announcing the results, primary committee chairman Adamu Maina Waziri labeled the election as fair and thanked the delegates for the peaceful primary. However, the three losing candidates petitioned against Lawal's victory using claims of illegal interference from state party PDP Chairman Bala Mande to appeal to national party chairman Iyorchia Ayu. After Ayu did not act, the losing candidates took their case to the judiciary in an attempt to annul the primary; their case was successful and the primary was annulled on 16 September by a Federal High Court based on electoral irregularities. Within days, the state PDP declined to appeal and instead scheduled a new primary for 23 September; in the days before, the party held its candidate screening exercise and conducted a mini congress to add women to the list of delegates. In the rerun primary, Lawal won again by a similarly wide margin. However, on 8 November, another Federal High Court ruling nullified the rerun primary due to further irregularities and barred the party from fielding a nominee in the gubernatorial election. On November 23, a Court of Appeal panel sitting in Sokoto dismissed Lawal's appeal. However, another appeal was successful in January, reinstated Lawal as the legitimate nominee. The decision was affirmed by the Supreme Court on 6 March in a unanimous panel judgment.

Nominated 
 Dauda Lawal: banker
 Running mate—Mani Mallam Mummuni

Eliminated in primary 
 Wadatau Madawaki: civil servant
 Ibrahim Shehu Gusau: engineer
 Hafiz Usman Nahuche

Withdrew 
 Mahdi Aliyu Mohammed Gusau: Deputy Governor (2019–2022) and son of former Defence Minister Aliyu Mohammed Gusau

Results

Minor parties 

 Mohammed Giggi (Accord)
Running mate: Suleman Bello
 Kabiru Sani (Action Alliance)
Running mate: Abubakar‬ Abdulrahman
 Usman Isah (Action Democratic Party)
Running mate: Amina Abdullahi
 Zayyanu Salisu (Action Peoples Party)
Running mate: Muhammad Bello
 Hashim Ahmad (African Democratic Congress)
Running mate: Jafaru Salisu Gusau
 Lawali Usman (All Progressives Grand Alliance)
Running mate: Mustapha Danmaliki
 Muhammad Abdulra'uf (Boot Party)
Running mate: Bello Nura
 Ahmed Yahuza (Labour Party)
Running mate: Umar Danmalan Sule
 Saidu Aliyu Dansadau (National Rescue Movement)
Running mate: Saidu Haruna G/Baure
 Sani Washo (Social Democratic Party)
Running mate: Rufai Lawali
 Sani Umar (Young Progressives Party)
Running mate: Abubakar Gandi
 Hadiza Usman (Zenith Labour Party)
Running mate: Sani Yusuf

Campaign
Early in the post-primary period, pundits noted that the race followed the trend of Zamfara elections being categorized by defections and ad hoc alliances. Matawalle's defection to the APC in June 2021 and the May 2022 deal with former Governor Abdul'aziz Abubakar Yari and former Senator Kabir Garba Marafa created a deep contrast for the 2023 election compared to the 2019 election when Matawalle was in the PDP up against the APC split between Yari and Marafa. Analysts also noted continued defections between parties as several APC politicians unhappy with the Matawalle-Yari-Marafa deal joined the PDP while some PDP party officials left to the NNPP. These dynamics took a backseat to internal PDP drama by September, when a case from losing primary aspirants led a High Court to annul the PDP primary and order the party to conduct a new primary. Despite the intra-party crisis, Lawal was nominated again on 23 September.

The next month, national attention turned to the race due to controversy as Matawalle ordered the shutdown of several television and radio stations on 15 October in retaliation after the stations had covered a Lawal campaign event. The action was widely condemned by press freedom organizations which labeled the action as a clear violation of the freedom of the press and overall rule of law. Amid the controversy was a violent clash between APC and PDP supporters in Gusau that left one dead and 18 wounded; both major parties traded blame for the tragedy and it raised fears of further electoral violence. The fears were unfortunately confirmed the next week when police opened fire on PDP demonstrators on 20 October, allegedly on the orders of Matawalle.

In November, focus returned to legal complications for Lawal as another High Court ruling annulled the rerun primary along with barring the PDP from fielding a nominee in the election. Internal PDP opponents of Lawal blamed him for the party's disqualification while Lawal implored his supporters to remain calm and said that he would appeal the judgment. Although his initial appeal was dismissed, a later appeal was successful and Lawal was reinstated as PDP nominee in early January 2023. Amid Lawal's legal struggles, Matawalle faced similar legal problems but related to corruption allegations; the Economic and Financial Crimes Commission presented a Federal High Court in October 2022 with evidence that Matawalle used stolen public funds to personally purchase Abuja properties. The revelations, in addition to previous corruption allegations and new reporting that large amounts of cash had been found in a Matawalle-owned house, tarnished Matawalle's image in the later months of 2022.

In the week prior to the presidential election on 25 February, the Matawalle administration issued a ban on non-governmental organizations operating in the state; once again, the state government came under intense criticism that labeled the move as authoritarian. Later in February, the state voted in the presidential election; Bola Tinubu (APC) won the state with 59% of the vote, beating Atiku Abubakar (PDP) at 39%. Despite the presidential result, gubernatorial campaign analysis noted the competitiveness of the race with a focus on Matawalle's support among notable state political figures along with Lawal's support among voters pushing for a power shift to the central senatorial district. Additionally, Lawal's urban base in cities like Gusau was contrasted with Matawalle's rural support.

Projections

Conduct

Electoral timetable

Pre-election
Due to widespread insecurity in the state, civil society groups raised concern about the safe conduct of the election in heavily-insecure areas.

General election

Results

By senatorial district 
The results of the election by senatorial district.

By federal constituency
The results of the election by federal constituency.

By local government area 
The results of the election by local government area.

See also 
 2023 Nigerian elections
 2023 Nigerian gubernatorial elections

Notes

References 

Zamfara State gubernatorial election
2023
2023 Zamfara State elections
Zamfara